This is a list of Croatian television related events from 2011.

Events
13 March - Croatia debuted on Veliki brat. It was aired on RTL.
17 June - Goran Kos wins the third and final season of Hrvatska traži zvijezdu.
27 June - Marijana Čvrljak wins the fourth and final season of Veliki brat for Croatia, becoming the show's first and only female winner.
17 December - Singer Marko Tolja and his partner Ana Herceg win the sixth season of Ples sa zvijezdama.
18 December - Shadow theatre company Promenada Klub win the third and final season of Supertalent

Debuts
13 March - Veliki brat (2011-2013, 2015–present)

Television shows

2000s
Ples sa zvijezdama (2006-2013)

Ending this year
Hrvatska traži zvijezdu (2009-2011)
Supertalent (2009-2011, 2016–present)

Births

Deaths

See also
2011 in Croatia